Bradley Oliver Barry (born 13 February 1995) is an English professional footballer who plays as a defender for National League South club Eastbourne Borough.

Club career

Early career
Barry started his career within the youth ranks at Brighton & Hove Albion before signing a development contract with them in 2013. However, Barry suffered a leg injury that kept him sidelined for 11 months. After recovering from his leg injury, Barry returned to development squad and played his first match, as well as captain, against Blackburn Rovers U21 on 18 August 2014.

Barry was released by ‘the Seagulls’ in the summer of 2015 without making a single appearance for the senior side.

Swindon Town
Preceding his release from Brighton, Barry joined League One side Swindon Town on a one-year deal following a successful trial.

On 1 September 2015, Barry went onto make his Swindon debut in their Football League Trophy victory over Newport County, featuring for the full 90 minutes. Four days later, Barry made his league debut for the club in their 3–1 away victory against Crewe Alexandra, once again featuring for the entire 90 minutes. Despite suffering setback of injuries, Barry went onto make thirty-four more league starts for Swindon before signing a new one-year deal alongside teammate Ellis Iandolo in July 2016.

In the 2016–17 season, on 20 August 2016, Barry scored his first goal for Swindon, netting the winner in their 1–0 victory over Port Vale in the 47th minute. However, Barry's first team opportunities was soon limited with injuries and suspension, which has affected his season. Despite this, Barry went on to make twenty-six appearances and scoring once in all competitions.

On 2 May 2017, it was announced that Barry would leave Swindon upon the expiry of his contract in June 2017.

Chesterfield
On 18 May 2017, Barry signed a two-year deal with Chesterfield. He was loaned out to Dover Athletic in September 2018. After missing six games for Dover and amidst an injury crisis at Chesterfield, he was recalled early in November.

Barry left the club in May 2019, at the expiry of his contract.

Barrow
Shortly after his exit from Chesterfield, Barry signed a two-year deal at Barrow, also in the National League. In his first season he formed part of the side that won promotion to League Two.

Stevenage
Barry signed for fellow League Two club Stevenage on 8 July 2021.

Personal life
Barry is the nephew of former Aston Villa, Manchester City and England international, Gareth Barry.

Career statistics

References

External links

1995 births
Living people
Sportspeople from Hastings
English footballers
Association football defenders
Brighton & Hove Albion F.C. players
Swindon Town F.C. players
Chesterfield F.C. players
Dover Athletic F.C. players
Barrow A.F.C. players
Stevenage F.C. players
Eastbourne Borough F.C. players
English Football League players
National League (English football) players